Journal de la ville et du Grand-Duché de Luxembourg was a newspaper published in Luxembourg between 1826 and 1844.

Defunct newspapers published in Luxembourg
French-language newspapers published in Luxembourg
1826 in Luxembourg
1844 in Luxembourg